Luobei County is a county of eastern Heilongjiang province, People's Republic of China, bordering Russia's Jewish Autonomous Oblast to the north. It is under the jurisdiction of the prefecture-level city of Hegang.

Administrative divisions 
Luobei County is divided into 6 towns, 1 township and 1 ethnic township. 
6 towns
 Fengxiang, Hebei, Mingshan, Tuanjie, Zhaoxing, Yunshan
1 township
 Taipinggou
1 ethnic township
 Dongming Korean

Demographics 

Climate

Crush video

In 2006 an Internet crush video surfaced in which a woman stomps on a kitten with stiletto high-heels. Eventually the woman drives her heel into the kitten's eye and penetrates the eye socket, leading to loss of blood and the death of the kitten. Internet users discovered and revealed the identity of the woman as Wang Jue, a Chinese nurse, and revealed that the cameraman is a provincial television employee. Wang Jue posted an apology on the Luobei county government official website, claiming that she was susceptible to persuasion to crush the kitten, being despondent from her recent divorce. Both Wang Jue and the cameraman lost their jobs as a result of the incident, although their actions were not illegal under Chinese animal cruelty laws.

References

External links
 
  Government site - 

 
Luobei
Hegang